Woodside is a small incorporated town in San Mateo County, California, United States, on the San Francisco Peninsula. Woodside is among the wealthiest communities in the United States, home to many technology billionaires and investment managers, with average home prices exceeding 10 million dollars. It has a council–manager system of government. The population of the town was 5,309 at the 2020 census.

Woodside is among the wealthiest communities in the United States with a median household income of $375,561, median family income of $401,591 and median home price exceeding $4.5 million.

History and culture 
The Woodside area was originally home to indigenous people belonging to the Ohlone tribe. In 1769, led by Gaspar de Portolá, Spanish explorers searching for San Francisco Bay camped at a site near Woodside.

Woodside is said to be the oldest English-speaking settlement in the southern part of the San Francisco Peninsula. The first English-speaking settlers arrived in the early 19th century to log the rich stands of redwoods. Charles Brown constructed the first sawmill in Woodside on his Mountain Home Ranch around 1838. Brown's adobe house, built in 1839, still stands today. By mid-century, the Woodside area had a dozen mills producing building materials for a booming San Francisco.

In 1849, during the California Gold Rush, 20-year-old Mathias Alfred Parkhurst purchased  of timberland and named it “Woodside"; of course, this name was kept. By the late 19th century, Woodside was home to country estates.  The Sequoia Redwood trees in Woodside are currently 3rd generation growth.  The first generation of the Redwood trees were used to build San Francisco's original homes.  After the 1906 San Francisco earthquake, the loggers returned to Woodside to cut the second growth of redwood so they could be used for the rebuilding of San Francisco.

In 1909, the Family, a private club, set up camp facilities and rustic buildings in Woodside at the Family Farm, a rural retreat used by club members for recreation. Gatherings at the Family Farm include an annual Farm Play, written and performed by members. In 1912, the Family pooled funds to build Our Lady of the Wayside Church in Portola Valley, designed by 19-year-old Timothy L. Pflueger, his first commission. The historic building was repaired at a cost of US$600,000 after the 1989 Loma Prieta earthquake.

Woodside was incorporated in 1956 and it retains a rural residential character even though it is only a short commute to Silicon Valley and Stanford University.

In early 2022, the town drew widespread derision for declaring itself a mountain lion habitat to avoid state affordable housing requirements. It backed down on that attempt after California Attorney General Rob Bonta denied this claim.  Bonta wrote: "There is no valid basis to claim that the entire town of Woodside is a habitat for mountain lions. Land that is already developed — with, for example a single-family home — is not, by definition, habitat. (...) Our message to local governments is simple: act in good faith, follow the law, and do your part to increase the housing supply."

Present
Today, Woodside is among the wealthiest small towns in the United States.

The intentionally small business district includes: a few restaurants; a grocery store; a saloon; a hardware and horse tack store; a home and garden store; an Aveda hair salon; a cleaner; and a post office. Outside of the business district are the Stillheart Institute educational event center, Skywood Trading Post and the Mountain Terrace event center.

Town restaurants include the Michelin starred Village Pub, Buck's of Woodside restaurant, known among Silicon Valley entrepreneurs as the location where many VC investment deals have been signed, Firehouse Bistro, and the Little Country Store.

Numerous residents keep horses, and the town government maintains a network of horse trails. Some residents live on farmland used for business. The town is also popular among local cyclists and draws them in large numbers on weekends. The most popular road cycling routes include Old La Honda Road, King's Mountain Road, Cañada Road, Southgate Drive, Skyline Boulevard and Highway 84. The Tour of California bicycle race includes several roads along and adjacent to CA-84 and Skyline Boulevard.

Woodside is home to a number of open space preserves, including the Purisima Open Space (part of the Midpeninsula Regional Open Space), where both horseback riding and bicycling are allowed. For mountain biking, the famous Skeggs Point is located in Woodside along Skyline Boulevard.

Dr. Carl Djerassi founded an artists' colony in the community in memory of his late daughter Pamela. The Djerassi Artists Residency is one of several Bay Area programs that houses artists. It is located adjacent to the campus of Stanford University, east of the town. Other Bay Area programs include Montalvo Arts Center in Saratoga and Headlands Center for the Arts in Marin.  Woodside is also home to wellness centers including the Canyon Ranch Woodside luxury wellness retreat.

Geography and climate 
Woodside is located on the San Francisco Peninsula, midway between San Jose and San Francisco, just north of Silicon Valley, in San Mateo County.  The San Andreas fault runs through portions of Woodside.  Much of Woodside is wooded, with redwoods and Douglas fir dominating in the western hills and more oaks and eucalyptus in the lower areas. San Francisco Bay lies to the east, while Pacific Ocean beaches lie to the west. The Santa Cruz mountains separate Woodside from the ocean and extend down to Monterey Bay about forty miles south.

The nearest cities and towns are Redwood City, Menlo Park, Portola Valley, Atherton, San Carlos, Belmont, and Palo Alto.

Climate
As is true of most of the California coastal areas, weather in Woodside is usually mild during most of the year. Summers are dry and can be hot; winter temperatures rarely dip much below freezing. Snowfall is extremely rare except in the nearby Santa Cruz Mountains, where several inches falls every several years. Annual precipitation averages 30.9 inches (785.4 millimeters) and falls on an average of 61 days annually.

Temperatures reach 90 °F (32 °C) or higher on an average of 48.4 days annually. Temperatures drop to freezing on an average of 10.0 days annually. On February 5, 1976, 3.0 inches of snow fell at the fire station.

Hills and mountains between Woodside and the Pacific coast make fog much less prevalent than in nearby San Francisco. As well, during the summer, Woodside's climate is remarkably hotter than that of San Francisco.

Parks and environmental features
Woodside has a variety of habitat types including California oak woodland and riparian zones.  There is considerable biodiversity present, Woodside being within the California Floristic Province.  Notable species present include the rare and endangered species Acanthomintha duttonii, the San Mateo Thornmint. It is also home to Huddart County Park, which is accessible by authorized motor vehicles, pedestrians, and horses on Kings Mountain Road.

While Huddart County Park is probably the most well-known park in Woodside, Wunderlich Park is extremely popular with both hiking and horse enthusiasts. The trails in this park are shared by those on foot and on horse and span almost 1000 acres.

Demographics

2010 Census
At the 2010 census Woodside had a population of 5,287. The racial makeup of Woodside was 4,717 (89.2%) White, 23 (0.4%) African American, 4 (0.1%) Native American, 332 (6.3%) Asian, 4 (0.1%) Pacific Islander, 63 (1.2%) from other races, and 144 (2.7%) from two or more races. There were 243 residents of Hispanic or Latino origin, of any race (4.6%).

There were 1,977 households.  The average household size was 2.67.  There were 1,487 families (75.2% of households); the average family size was 3.01.  The median age was 48.8 years. The homeowner vacancy rate was 0.9%; the rental vacancy rate was 3.7%.

Economy
Woodside is home to many venture capital and investment firms including: Benchmark Capital Partners, Crosslink Capital, Defy.vc, GSV Asset Management, ND Capital, Redpoint Ventures, and Ridgelink Ventures.

Politics
According to the California Secretary of State, as of October 24, 2016, Woodside has 4082 registered voters. Of those, 1606 (39.3%) are registered Democrats, 1256 (30.8%) are registered Republicans, and 1052 (25.9%) have declined to state a political party.

Schools
The Woodside Elementary School District operates public elementary and middle schools. The Sequoia Union High School District operates Woodside High School.

Funding for public schools in Woodside are supplemented by grants from private foundations set up for that purpose and funded by local residents that enables Woodside to have one of the highest per pupil funding rates for elementary school and middle school students in the Bay Area.

Points of interest

The city is served by the Woodside Public Library of the San Mateo County Libraries, a member of the Peninsula Library System.

Film and television
The house in the Robin Williams movie Bicentennial Man is in Woodside. Dynasty was filmed at the Filoli Estate (not the interior of the mansion, but the exterior), as were the films The Wedding Planner, The Game, Lolita, George of the Jungle, Heaven Can Wait, and Harold and Maude. The musical Rent also has a scene filmed inside the Filoli Estate.

Notable people

Several notable people who live or have lived in Woodside, California, include:

Actors and entertainment 
 Michelle Pfeiffer, actress, and her husband David E. Kelley, television producer
 Shirley Temple Black, child movie star

Artists and designers 
 Frances Baldwin, artist and painter
 Margaret Keane, artist who produced popular paintings of "big eye" waifs, and Walter Keane, her husband, who falsely claimed he had painted them.

Business and entrepreneurs 
 Nolan Bushnell, founder of Atari and Chuck E. Cheese's Pizza-Time Theater
 Scott Cook, co-founder of Intuit, Inc.
 John Doerr, venture capitalist
Masayoshi Son, founder and CEO of Softbank
Larry Ellison, CEO of Oracle Corporation, who spent nine years building an architecturally authentic, $200+ million Japanese feudal castle and man-made lake in Woodside;
Kenneth Fisher, founder of Fisher Investments, Forbes columnist, author, and local historian
James Folger, coffee magnate
Kazuo Hirai, CEO of Sony Corporation
Steve Jobs, co-founder of Apple Inc. owned the Jackling House in Woodside, but had it demolished and was in the process of replacing it with a modern home on the same parcel before his death.
Mike Markkula, second CEO of Apple Inc.
Gordon E. Moore, co-founder of Intel and originator of Moore's Law
Charles R. Schwab, American investor and founder of Charles Schwab Corporation
Thomas Siebel, founder of Siebel Systems
Jeffrey Skoll, Canadian internet entrepreneur 
John Thompson, CEO of Symantec 
Nick Woodman, founder and CEO of GoPro

Musicians 

 Joan Baez, folk singer
 Neil Young, rock musician and songwriter, who owns a  ranch and recording studio.

Scientists 

 Carl Djerassi, novelist, Stanford professor, and member of team that developed the birth control pill
 Koko, the gorilla who was taught in American Sign Language

Sports 
Julian Edelman, football player, attended Woodside High School
Willie McCovey, played nineteen seasons for the San Francisco Giants. McCovey Cove at AT&T Park, and Willie McCovey Field at Woodside Elementary School are named after him.
Zack Test, rugby union player
Bill Walsh, former San Francisco 49ers head coach and Pro Football Hall of Fame, who died on July 30, 2007.
Ricky Watters, Former NFL running back

Other 
Prince Vasili Alexandrovich of Russia, Russian royalty, nephew of Tsar Nicholas II

See also

 Skeggs Point, California

References

External links

 
 Woodside Public Library – a branch of the San Mateo County Library
 Woodside Fire Protection District

 
Cities in San Mateo County, California
Cities in the San Francisco Bay Area
Incorporated cities and towns in California